is a Japanese television drama series aired in Japan on Fuji Television in 2003. There were 32 swimmers in this drama who were carefully chosen to fit their roles, but none of them had ever done synchronized swimming before.

Story
Two years after the movie Water Boys takes place, the boys of Tadano High School are still in the club. The series tells the life and hardships of the boys as they learn synchronized swimming.

Cast
Main cast
 Kankuro Shindo – Takayuki Yamada
 Norio Tatematsu – Mirai Moriyama
 Masatoshi Tanaka – Eita
 Go Takahara – Yuma Ishigaki
 Futoshi Ishizuka – Tomoya Ishii
 Asako Onishi – Mao Miyaji
 Kyoko Hanamura – Yu Kashii
 Mr. Ozaki – Kei Tani
 Mr. Yamaoka – Akira Fuse
 Mr. Sugita – Tetta Sugimoto
 Ms. Sakuma – Kaori Manabe
 Ms. Onogawa – Maiko Kikuchi
 Mama (of a bar) – Akira Emoto
 Chi-mama – Yuu Tokui
 Mr. Isomura – Naoto Takenaka
 Kiyomasa Isomura – Norito Yashima
 Katsumasa Sato – Hiroshi Tamaki
 Miwako Shindo – Hitomi Takahashi
 Kanichi Shindo – Kazuyuki Asano
 Hitomi Shindo – Yukiko Ikari
 Daichi Kitajima – Reo Katayama
 Atsumi Hayakawa – Saki Aibu
 Mr. Tatematsu – Sei Hiraizumi

Synchro Boy Group
 Takahiro Hōjō
 Yōsuke Fujisawa
 Yū Arakawa
 Kōki Katō
 Tenma Nosaki
 Kei Tanaka
 Hidemasa Shiozawa
 Tatsuya Isaka
 Hiroyuki Hamada
 Atsushi Abe
 Hironori Ehata
 Ichitarō
 Shintarō Chikada
 Taiyō Takeuchi
 Takanori Kawamoto
 Atsushi Sekita
 Takashi Hyuuga
 Nobuyuki Namiki
 Kougaku Washiatama
 Ichirō Shin
 Satoshi Wakisaki
 Gen Hoshino

Episodes
 Otoko no Synchro!? (男のシンクロ!?)
 Synchro Ayaushi!? (シンクロ危うし!?)
 Shuku Kessei! Synchro Dōkōkai (祝結成!シンクロ同好会)
 Synchro Kōen Kekkō (シンクロ公演決行)
 Synchro Natsu Gasshuku (シンクロ夏合宿!)
 Namida no Inter-High (涙のインターハイ)
 Synchro e no Omoi (シンクロへの想い)
 Natsu Da! Umi Da! Same Otoko Da (夏だ!海だ!サメ男だ)
 Kaisan Nanka Shinai (解散なんかしない)
 32-nin ga Okosu Kiseki (32人が起こす奇跡)
 Otoko no Synchro Kōen Saikō no Namida! (男のシンクロ公演最高の涙!)

References

2003 Japanese television series debuts
2003 Japanese television series endings
Japanese drama television series
Fuji TV dramas